This article lists the results of the China women's national football team.

Best / Worst Results

Best

Worst

Results by years

1980s

1990s

2000s

2010s

2020s

See also
 China women's national football team head to head
 China national football team results and fixtures

References

External links
Official match results of the China women's national football team, theCFA.cn 
Worldfootball.net